Jia Angeli Carla Tolentino (born 1988) is an American writer and editor. A staff writer for The New Yorker, she  previously worked as deputy editor of Jezebel and a contributing editor at The Hairpin. Her writing has also appeared in The New York Times Magazine and Pitchfork. In 2019, her collected essays were published as Trick Mirror: Reflections on Self-Delusion.

Early life and education 
Tolentino was born in Toronto, Ontario, to parents from the Philippines. When she was four, Tolentino, her younger brother, and her parents moved to Houston, Texas where she grew up in a Southern Baptist community. Tolentino attended an evangelical megachurch and a small Christian private school. Tolentino started elementary school early and graduated from high school as her class salutatorian.

At the age of 15, she participated in the game show, Girls v. Boys, in Puerto Rico.

In 2005, Tolentino enrolled at the University of Virginia as a Jefferson Scholar, studying English, joining the Pi Beta Phi sorority, and participating in an a cappella group called The Virginia Belles. After graduating from UVA in 2009, Tolentino spent a year as a Peace Corps volunteer in Kyrgyzstan. Tolentino earned an MFA from the University of Michigan.

Career 
Tolentino began writing for The Hairpin in 2013, hired by then-editor-in-chief Emma Carmichael. In 2014, Tolentino and Carmichael both moved to Jezebel, where Tolentino worked for two years before joining The New Yorker.

Tolentino's writing has won accolades across genres. Flavorwire called her a "go-to music source," while her first short story won the fall 2012 Raymond Carver Short Fiction Contest and was nominated for a Pushcart Prize. She has also garnered favorable attention for essays on topics such as race in publishing, marriage, abortion, and notions of female empowerment, as well as for her no-pulled-punches music criticism. The A.V. Club admired "Tolentino's sick burns on Charlie Puth" and Studio 360 observed that even in the near-universal panning of Magic!'s song "Rude", "no criticism has been quite as cutting as Jia Tolentino's." Tolentino has reported extensively on the #MeToo movement.

In 2017, Tolentino was chosen by Forbes for their 30 under 30 list.

On August 6, 2019, Tolentino published a collection of essays entitled Trick Mirror: Reflections on Self-Delusion. It made its debut on The New York Times Bestseller List on August 25, coming in at #2 on the Combined Print & E-Book Non-fiction list. In a review for The New York Times, Maggie Doherty wrote: "Tolentino’s earnest ambivalence, expressed often throughout the book, is characteristic of millennial life-writing, and it can be contrasted with boomer self-satisfaction and Gen X disaffection in the same genre." Slate columnist Laura Miller wrote in her review of the book, "Tolentino is a classical essayist along the lines of Montaigne, threading her way on the page toward an understanding of what she thinks and feels about life, the world, and herself." Lauren Oyler's negative review of Trick Mirror in the London Review of Books, "skewer[ed] the essays’ shallowness and prose quality," though Tolentino reacted positively to the review, calling it a "cleansing, illuminating experience to be read with such open disgust!"

Her 2021 reporting on the conservatorship of Britney Spears, co-authored with Ronan Farrow, attracted international attention, with the piece being described as "blistering" by Tyler Aquilina in Entertainment Weekly and as a "journalistic reference text on Britney Spears" by Dirk Peitz in Die Zeit.

In January 2023, Tolentino made a cameo in the HBO Max show Gossip Girl (2021).

Personal life
Tolentino met her partner, Andrew Daley, an architect, while they were students at UVA. In the essay "I Thee Dread" in her book Trick Mirror, Tolentino writes at length about her ambivalence toward marriage. According to Tolentino, she married her partner in November 2021.

On August 15, 2020, Tolentino announced via Instagram that she had given birth to a baby girl.

References

External links

 Official website
 Jia Tolentino at The New Yorker
 Interview with Jia Tolentino at Catapult.co
 All the Greedy Young Abigail Fishers and Me, Jezebel, June 28, 2016.

1988 births
21st-century American essayists
21st-century American non-fiction writers
21st-century American women writers
American feminist writers
American music critics
American women music critics
American women essayists
Canadian emigrants to the United States
Gawker Media
Living people
Peace Corps volunteers
People from Clinton Hill, Brooklyn
The New Yorker staff writers
University of Michigan alumni
University of Virginia alumni
Writers from Brooklyn
Writers from Houston
Writers from Toronto
American writers of Filipino descent